Allen Barra is an American journalist and author of sports books.  He is a contributing editor of American Heritage magazine, and regularly writes about sports for The Wall Street Journal and The Atlantic.  He has also written for The New York Times and The New York Observer, and was formerly a columnist for Salon.  He formerly blogged on sports for the Village Voice website. He frequently contributes to Major League Baseball Radio and The Daily Beast.

Personal
Barra, born in Birmingham, Alabama, currently lives in South Orange, New Jersey.

Publications
His 2009 book on Yogi Berra, Yogi Berra: Eternal Yankee, was praised as "sturdy," "well-written," and "thorough" by the San Francisco Chronicle, but The New York Times thought it too enthralled with its subject. In 2010, Barra wrote "Rickwood Field: A Century in America's Oldest Ballpark".

Perception
Barra was one of the few sportswriters to agree with Rush Limbaugh that Donovan McNabb was overrated because of his race.

In 2009, he was the target of a widely read critique at the website Deadspin, which targeted Barra's subjective adoration for Derek Jeter.  Barra then responded, five years later, in an article for Salon, 
that his argument was based on the premise that Jeter contributes in "ways that don’t necessarily show up in a box score" rather than his argument from the piece that "many observers think the primary reason (for the Yankees' success in 2009) is Mr. Jeter" rather than giving credit to the achievements of the team as a whole (six other members of the starting lineup had an OPS over 120+).

References

American male non-fiction writers
Living people
Year of birth missing (living people)
Writers from Birmingham, Alabama
People from South Orange, New Jersey